Manuel Pasqual (born 13 March 1982) is a retired Italian professional footballer who played for the Italy national team. He is an offensive left-back who is well known for his crossing ability. He is also capable of playing as a wide midfielder or as wing-back on the left in a 3–5–2 formation. Pasqual is a dead-ball specialist and often took free-kicks as well as corners for Fiorentina, providing several assists from his curling indirect set pieces and crosses.

Club career

Early career
After a couple of seasons playing for lowly-placed Serie D teams such as Derthona and Pordenone, Pasqual joined Serie C1's Arezzo in January 2002, having previously played for Treviso, at that point also a team in Serie C1. Pasqual became a key player at Arezzo, and one of the main catalysts for promotion into Serie B. Pasqual played one more remarkable season for Arezzo.

Fiorentina
On 4 July 2005, Pasqual joined Fiorentina in a joint-ownership deal. He made his Serie A debut on 18 September against Udinese, a match which finished 4–2. His good form in his first Serie A season earned him a call-up to the Italy national team from its head coach, Marcello Lippi. Fiorentina made a full bid for his services in June 2006.

At Fiorentina, Pasqual became known for his powerful left foot and foraging runs. After a disappointing dip in form during the 2007–08 season, Pasqual was highly linked with the likes of Juventus and Napli, and was almost certain to leave with the arrival of winger Juan Manuel Vargas. However, Vargas' disappointing form in defence allowed him to move forward, and Pasqual made a grand return in the 2008–09 season, silencing many of his critics with his performances and even scoring his first goal in over two years.

In July 2009, Pasqual signed a new, three-year contract with Fiorentina. He extended his contract again in November 2011.

Since the 2012–13 season, Pasqual has been Fiorentina's team captain.

Empoli
On 31 May 2016, Pasqual signed with Empoli on a two-year contract.

International career
Pasqual's performances earned him a national team call up by then-Italy coach Marcello Lippi, who capped him for a friendly match against Germany, played at his club's home stadium in Florence, the Stadio Artemio Franchi, on 1 March 2006. Italy sensationally won the match by 4–1, with Pasqual coming on in the last minute as a substitute for Mauro Camoranesi. Pasqual also attracted the attention of Roberto Donadoni, who succeeded Lippi. Donadoni called-up Pasqual for Italy's UEFA Euro 2008 qualification matches against Lithuania and France in September, and matches against Ukraine and Georgia in October. On 10 September 2013, he was capped by Italy coach Cesare Prandelli in a 2014 FIFA World Cup qualifier against the Czech Republic. He was named in Prandelli's 30-man provisional squad for the final tournament on 13 May 2014, but was cut from the final 23-man squad named on 1 June.

Career statistics

Club

International

References

External links
 
 Manuel Pasqual at FootballDatabase.com
 
 Manuel Pasqual at FIGC.it  

1982 births
Living people
Italian footballers
Italy international footballers
Treviso F.B.C. 1993 players
S.S. Arezzo players
ACF Fiorentina players
Empoli F.C. players
Association football fullbacks
Serie A players
Serie B players
People from San Donà di Piave
Footballers from Veneto
A.S.D. HSL Derthona players
Sportspeople from the Metropolitan City of Venice